41st Street may refer to:

 41st Street (Baltimore)
 41st Street (Manhattan)

See also 
 Oakridge–41st Avenue station in Vancouver, British Columbia, Canada